Estola albosparsa is a species of beetle in the family Cerambycidae. It was described by Thomson in 1858. It is known from Brazil.

References

Estola
Beetles described in 1858